Silattur  is a large village located in Aranthangi Taluk of Pudukkottai district in the state of Tamil Nadu, India. Silattur is also called as Small Singapore. As of 2011, total 1289 families residing in Silattur Village. As per constitution of India and Panchyati Raaj Act, Silattur village is administrated by Sarpanch (Head of Village) who is elected representative of village.  Silattur is situated 10 km away from sub-district headquarter Aranthangi and 25 km away from district headquarter Pudukkottai.

Geography
Total geographical area of Silattur village is 11.52 km2 and it is the 5th Biggest Village by area in the Sub District. Population density of the village is 443 persons per km2.

Demographics

As per the 2011 census, Silattur had a total population of 5099, of which 2528 are males while 2571 are females. In Silattur village population of children with age 0-6 is 514 which makes up 10.08% of total population of village. Silattur village has higher literacy rate compared to Tamil Nadu. In 2011, literacy rate of Silattur village was 82.66% compared to 80.09% of Tamil Nadu. In Silattur Male literacy stands at 89.39% while female literacy rate was 76.06%.

Temples
Sri Ponnambalanathar Aalayam
Arulmiku Sri Muthumaari Amman ThirukKovil
Arulmiku Sri Veeramakali Amman Kovil
Ayyanar Kovil
Sri Maduraiveeran & Kombukaran Kovil
Sri Aathi Arupadai Veedu Murugan Kovil
Sri Theradi Karuppar Kovil
Arasamaram Sri Valampuri Vinayakar kovil
 Sri Nondi Ayya Temple
 Sri Raja Ganapathi Temple
 Sri Chinniyamman Temple

Education

Government Boys Higher Secondary School
Government Girls Higher Secondary School
Yazh Academy Nursery & Primary School
Panchayat Union Elementary School 
Swamy Vivekananda Nursery & Primary School

Banks
State Bank of India
City Union Bank

Hospital
Government Hospital 24hrs.

References

Villages in Pudukkottai district